Tristachya (common name trident grasses) is a genus of African and Latin American plants in tribe Tristachyideae within the grass family.

 Species

 formerly included
see Danthoniopsis Dilophotriche Loudetia Loudetiopsis Trichopteryx Zonotriche

References

External links
 Grassbase - The World Online Grass Flora

Panicoideae
Poaceae genera